Iren may refer to:

Given name 

Irén Ágay (1913–1950), Hungarian actress
Irén Daruházi-Karcsics (1927-2011), Hungarian retired gymnast
Iren Marik (1905-1986), Hungarian-born classical pianist
Irén Pavlics (born 1934), Hungarian Slovene author and editor
Iren Reppen (born 1965), Norwegian actress
Irén Rostás, Hungarian orienteering competitor

Other uses 

Iren (river), Perm Krai, Russia
Inter Region Economic Network, a non-governmental organization based in Nairobi, Kenya